James Moontasri (born April 10, 1988) is a retired German-born American mixed martial artist who competes in the Welterweight division. Moontasri has competed in RFA and is currently signed with the UFC. James was also a silver medalist at the 2007 Pan American Games in taekwondo, 2007 USA Tae Kwon Do Male Athlete of the Year, and 2x USA Tae Kwon Do National Champion. He holds the rank of Brown Belt in Jiu Jitsu from Franklin Aguirre and Brandon Bender (James received his Blue Belt and Purple Belt from John Machado.)

Early life
Moontasri was born in Frankfurt, Germany to a Korean American mother and a Thai American military father.

Mixed martial arts career

Resurrection Fighting Alliance
With a 4–1 mixed martial arts record, Moontasri made his RFA debut on August 16, 2013, facing R.J. Clifford at RFA 9: Munhoz vs. Curran. He won the bout via third round TKO. In his next fight, he faced Rick Reger at RFA 12: Ortega vs. Koch on January 24, 2014, submitting Reger via a rear-naked choke in the second round.

For his third appearance with the promotion, Moontasri faced Jordan Rinaldi at RFA 15: Casey vs. Sanchez on June 6, 2014. He won the bout via second round KO, and just a couple weeks later, it was announced that Moontasri had signed with the UFC.

Ultimate Fighting Championship
After his win over Rinaldi, Moontasri was picked up by the UFC and faced fellow promotional newcomer Joe Ellenberger at UFC Fight Night: Swanson vs. Stephens on June 28, 2014. Despite hurting Ellenberger in the first round, he would rally in the second and third rounds and Moontasri lost via split decision. 8 of 11 media outlets scored the bout for Moontasri, while 3 scored a draw.

He was then scheduled to face Jake Lindsey at UFC Fight Night: Henderson vs. Thatch on February 14, 2015.  However, Lindsey pulled out of the bout because of an injury and was replaced by promotional newcomer Cody Pfister. Moontasri was dominate in the fight, finishing Pfister with a rear-naked choke in the second round.

Moontasri faced Kevin Lee on July 15, 2015 at UFC Fight Night 71. He lost the fight via submission in the first round.

Moontasri was expected to face Brendan O'Reilly in a welterweight bout on November 15, 2015 at UFC 193, filling in for an injured William Macário. Subsequently, O'Reilly pulled out of the fight in the week leading up to the event citing injury and was replaced by promotional newcomer Anton Zafir. He won the fight via TKO in the first round.

Moontasri next faced Alex Oliveira on July 23, 2016 at UFC on Fox 20. He lost the one-sided fight via unanimous decision.

Moontasri was expected to face Alex Morono on October 15, 2016 at UFC Fight Night 97. However, the promotion announced on October 6 that they had cancelled the event entirely. In turn, the pairing was quickly rescheduled and eventually took place on December 17, 2016 at UFC on Fox 22. Moontasri lost the fight by unanimous decision.

Mixed martial arts record

|-
|Loss
|align=center|9–5
|Alex Morono
|Decision (unanimous)
|UFC on Fox: VanZant vs. Waterson
|
|align=center|3
|align=center|5:00
|Sacramento, California, United States
| 
|-
|Loss
|align=center|9–4 
|Alex Oliveira
|Decision (unanimous)
|UFC on Fox: Holm vs. Shevchenko 
|
|align=center|3
|align=center|5:00
|Chicago, Illinois, United States
|  
|-
|Win
|align=center|9–3 
|Anton Zafir
|TKO (spinning back kick and spinning back fist) 
|UFC 193
|
|align=center|1
|align=center|4:36
|Melbourne, Australia
|
|-
|Loss
|align=center|8–3 
|Kevin Lee
|Submission (rear-naked choke)
|UFC Fight Night: Mir vs. Duffee
|
|align=center|1 
|align=center|2:56 
|San Diego, California, United States
|
|-
|Win
|align=center|8–2
|Cody Pfister
|Submission (rear-naked choke)
|UFC Fight Night: Henderson vs. Thatch
|
|align=center|2
|align=center|1:49
|Broomfield, Colorado, United States
|
|-
|Loss
|align=center|7–2
|Joe Ellenberger
|Decision (split)
|UFC Fight Night: Swanson vs. Stephens
|
|align=center|3
|align=center|5:00
|San Antonio, Texas, United States
|
|-
|Win
|align=center|7–1
|Jordan Rinaldi
|KO (punch)
|RFA 15: Casey vs. Sanchez
|
|align=center|2
|align=center|1:14
|Culver City, California, United States
|
|-
|Win
|align=center|6–1
|Rick Reger
|Technical Submission (rear-naked choke)
|RFA 12: Ortega vs. Koch
|
|align=center|2
|align=center|0:28
|Los Angeles, California, United States
|
|-
|Win
|align=center|5–1
|R.J. Clifford
|TKO (punches)
|RFA 9: Munhoz vs. Curran
|
|align=center|3
|align=center|2:40
|Los Angeles, California, United States
|
|-
|Loss
|align=center|4–1
|Darren Smith
|Decision (split)
|FCOC: Fight Club OC
|
|align=center|3
|align=center|5:00
|Costa Mesa, California, United States
|
|-
|Win
|align=center|4–0
|Joshua Aveles
|Decision (unanimous)
|RITC: Respect in the Cage
|
|align=center|3
|align=center|5:00
|Pomona, California, United States
|
|-
|Win
|align=center|3–0
|Joshua Aveles
|Decision (unanimous)
|RITC: Respect in the Cage
|
|align=center|3
|align=center|5:00
|Pomona, California, United States
|
|-
|Win
|align=center|2–0
|Tim Lindsay
|KO (punch)
|Gladiator Challenge: Hostile
|
|align=center|1
|align=center|0:56
|San Jacinto, California, United States
|
|-
|Win
|align=center|1–0
|Jade Delong
|Submission (verbal)
|GC 83: Savage
|
|align=center|2
|align=center|0:37
|San Bernardino, California, United States
|

See also
 List of current UFC fighters
 List of male mixed martial artists

References

External links
 
 

1988 births
American practitioners of Brazilian jiu-jitsu
Sportspeople from Frankfurt
Mixed martial artists from California
Living people
Lightweight mixed martial artists
American male mixed martial artists
American male taekwondo practitioners
American Muay Thai practitioners
American sportspeople of Korean descent
American sportspeople of Thai descent
American expatriate sportspeople in Germany
Taekwondo practitioners at the 2007 Pan American Games
Welterweight mixed martial artists
Mixed martial artists utilizing taekwondo
Mixed martial artists utilizing Muay Thai
Mixed martial artists utilizing Brazilian jiu-jitsu
Pan American Games medalists in taekwondo
Pan American Games silver medalists for the United States
Medalists at the 2007 Pan American Games
Ultimate Fighting Championship male fighters